Plagiobothrys canescens is a species of flowering plant in the borage family known by the common name valley popcornflower. It is endemic to California, where it is a common wildflower in valley, foothill, desert, coastline, and canyon habitat in the central and southern regions of the state.

Plagiobothrys canescens is an annual herb with a spreading or erect stem 10 to 60 centimeters in length. The leaves are located in a basal rosette about the base of the stem, with smaller ones located along the stem's length. The plant is coated in long, rough hairs and sometimes bristles. It is purple-edged and -veined and leaks purple juice when crushed. The inflorescence is a series of tiny flowers and hairy bracts. Each five-lobed white corolla measures 2 to 3 millimeters wide. The fruit is a rounded, arched nutlet no more than 2 millimeters long textured with cross-ribs.

References

External links
Jepson Manual eFlora (TJM2) treatment of Plagiobothrys canescens
Plagiobothrys canescens Photo gallery

canescens
Endemic flora of California
Flora of the California desert regions
Natural history of the California chaparral and woodlands
Natural history of the California Coast Ranges
Natural history of the Central Valley (California)
Natural history of the Channel Islands of California
Natural history of the Mojave Desert
Natural history of the Peninsular Ranges
Natural history of the Transverse Ranges